Mayoral elections were held in the Turkish province of İzmir as part of nationwide local elections on 31 March 2019. A total of 31 mayors, one for each of the 30 districts of İzmir and one for the İzmir Metropolitan Municipality, were elected.

Republican People's Party (CHP) candidate Tunç Soyer, the former Mayor of Seferihisar, was elected as Mayor of the İzmir Metropolitan Municipality, beating Justice and Development Party (AKP) candidate Nihat Zeybekci by 58.1% to 38.7%. Zeybekci conceded defeat soon after Soyer built an unassailable lead.

Candidates
On 27 November 2018, the ruling Justice and Development Party (AKP) announced their metropolitan mayoral candidate to be Nihat Zeybekci, the former mayor of Denizli and former Minister of the Economy. Due to the People's Alliance agreement, Zeybekci had the support of the Nationalist Movement Party (MHP).

With incumbent mayor Aziz Kocaoğlu announcing his intention to step down, the main opposition Republican People's Party (CHP) began considering new nominees. Tunç Soyer, the serving Mayor of Seferihisar, was seen as the frontrunner and was selected on 27 January 2019 despite Kocaoğlu re-entering the race shortly before the announcement. Soyer had the support of the İYİ Party and ran as the joint candidate of the Nation Alliance.

Results

References

İzmir
2010s in İzmir
Izmir